Carlos Daniel Santucho Gradiol (born March 12, 1985) is a Uruguayan footballer currently playing for Centro Deportivo Olmedo in the Ecuadorian Serie A.

Teams
 Liverpool 2005–2006
 Durazno 2007
 Liverpool 2007–2010
 Durazno 2010
 Universidad de Concepción 2011–2012
 El Tanque Sisley 2013–2014
 Olmedo 2014–present

References

External links
 

1985 births
Living people
People from Nueva Helvecia
Uruguayan footballers
Uruguayan expatriate footballers
Liverpool F.C. (Montevideo) players
Universidad de Concepción footballers
El Tanque Sisley players
C.D. Olmedo footballers
Chilean Primera División players
Expatriate footballers in Chile
Expatriate footballers in Ecuador
Association football defenders